In triangle geometry, the Steiner point is a particular point associated with a triangle.  It is a triangle center and it is designated as the center X(99) in Clark Kimberling's Encyclopedia of Triangle Centers. Jakob Steiner (1796–1863), Swiss mathematician, described this point in 1826. The point was given Steiner's name by Joseph Neuberg in 1886.

Definition

The Steiner point is defined as follows. (This is not the way in which Steiner defined it.)

Let  be any given triangle. Let  be the circumcenter and  be the symmedian point of triangle . The line through  perpendicular to the line  intersects the Brocard circle at another point . The line through  perpendicular to the line  intersects the Brocard circle at another point . The line through  perpendicular to the line  intersects the Brocard circle at another point . (The triangle  is the Brocard triangle of triangle .) Let  be the line through  parallel to the line ,  be the line through  parallel to the line  and  be the line through  parallel to the line . The point of concurrency is the Steiner point of triangle .

In the Encyclopedia of Triangle Centers the Steiner point is defined as follows;

Let  be any given triangle. Let  be the circumcenter and  be the symmedian point of triangle . Let  be the reflection of the line  in the line ,  be the reflection of the line  in the line  and  be the reflection of the line  in the line . The point of concurrency is the Steiner point of triangle .

Trilinear coordinates
The trilinear coordinates of the Steiner point are given below.

Properties
The Steiner point of triangle  lies on the Steiner circumellipse of triangle .
Canadian mathematician Ross Honsberger stated the following as a property of Steiner point: The Steiner point of a triangle is the center of mass of the system obtained by suspending at each vertex a mass equal to the magnitude of the exterior angle  at that vertex. The center of mass of such a system is in fact not the Steiner point, but the Steiner curvature centroid, which has the trilinear coordinates . It is the triangle center designated as X(1115) in Encyclopedia of Triangle Centers.

Tarry point

The Tarry point of a triangle is closely related to the Steiner point of the triangle. Let  be any given triangle. The point on the circumcircle of triangle  diametrically opposite to the Steiner point of triangle  is called the Tarry point of triangle . The Tarry point is a triangle center and it is designated as the center X(98) in Encyclopedia of Triangle Centers. The trilinear coordinates of the Tarry point are given below:

where  is the Brocard angle of triangle 
and 

Similar to the definition of the Steiner point, the Tarry point can be defined as follows:

Let  be any given triangle. Let  be the Brocard  triangle of triangle . Let  be the line through  perpendicular  to the line ,  be the line through  perpendicular  to the line  and  be the line through  perpendicular  to the line . The point of concurrency is the Tarry point of triangle .

References

Triangle centers